Heads You Die is a novel written by Steve Cole, which is the second book by the author in the Young Bond series, and the seventh chronological novel overall. The book will be published by Red Fox, which is an imprint of Random House that publishes a wide range of paperback books for various age groups. The book was released on May 5, 2016.

Plot
James's Cuban holiday has become a nightmare mission to save an old friend from a villain who has perfected 1,000 ways to kill. With corrupt cops and hired assassins hot on his heels, James must travel through Havana and brave Caribbean waters to stop a countdown to mass murder. Fates will be decided with the flip of a coin. Heads or tails. Live or die.

See also
 Outline of James Bond

References

External links
 Official Young Bond website

2016 British novels
Young Bond novels
Novels set in Cuba
Random House books